The City of Hobsons Bay is a local government area in Melbourne, Victoria, Australia. It comprises the south-western suburbs between 6 and 20 km from the Melbourne city centre.

It was founded on 22 June 1994 during the amalgamation of local councils by the state government from the City of Williamstown and the City of Altona, as well as the suburb of South Kingsville from the City of Footscray. It took its name from Hobsons Bay, named after Captain William Hobson. The city has an area of 64 square kilometres, and in June 2018 had a population of 96,470.

Council

The current councillors, in order of election at the 2020 election, are:

Education

Libraries
The library, run by the council has five branches: Altona, Altona Meadows, Altona North, Newport and Williamstown. Reflecting the multiculturalism of the community, the library service has a large amount of material in eight different languages.

The Environment Resource Centre is located in Altona library and provides the community access to resources concerning the environment, including initiatives and environmental groups in Hobsons Bay.

Transport

Suburban railway
Hobsons Bay has seven train stations on the Werribee railway line, in PTV Zones 1 and 2. These stations are Spotswood, Newport, Seaholme, Altona, Westona, Laverton and Aircraft. Previously on this line were the stations of Mobiltown, Paisley, and Galvin.

Williamstown railway line is another service which runs through Hobsons Bay. It departs the Werribee railway line at Newport and visits the stations of North Williamstown, Williamstown Beach, and Williamstown.

Freeways

The interchange between the West Gate Freeway, Western Ring Road and Princes Freeway lies in the north-west of Hobsons Bay.

From Hobsons Bay, the West Gate Freeway provides access to the Melbourne CBD and eastern suburbs (over the iconic West Gate Bridge), the Princes Freeway provides access to outer south-western suburbs and Geelong, while the Western Ring Road leads to the northern suburbs and Melbourne Airport.

Townships and localities
The 2021 census, the city had a population of 91,322 up from 88,778 in the 2016 census

^ - Territory divided with another LGA

Sister cities
  Anjo, Aichi, Japan
  Shire of Buloke, Victoria, Australia (friendship alliance)

See also
List of places on the Victorian Heritage Register in the City of Hobsons Bay
 List of Melbourne suburbs

References

External links
 
 Hobsons Bay City Council
 Hobsons Bay Community Online Forum
Metlink local public transport map
Link to Land Victoria interactive maps
 The Times - publisher of Hobsons Bay Times

Local government areas of Melbourne
Greater Melbourne (region)
 
1994 establishments in Australia
Populated places established in 1994